Naree Song ((born Naree Wongluekiet 1 May 1986) is a Korean professional golfer of Thai descent.

Song's birth name was Naree Wongluekiet, and she and her identical twin sister were born in Bangkok, Thailand.  Her father is South Korean and her mother is Thai.  She is a South Korean citizen, and has represented Thailand in junior team competition, but she has spent much of her life in the United States. Her hometown in the United States was Bradenton, Florida.

In 1999, Song was awarded the American Junior Golf Association All-American award. She competed in the U.S. Women's Open as an amateur in 2000 and she finished fortieth overall.  In 2001, Song won the Kosaido Thailand Ladies Open.  In 2002, she won the South Atlantic Ladies Amateur.

Song attended the University of Florida in Gainesville, Florida, United States, where she played for the Florida Gators women's golf team in 2003.  She turned professional in 2004.

Song played on both the Futures Tour and the LPGA Tour.

Song is the identical twin of Aree Song, who is also an LPGA Tour golfer.

Professional wins

Futures Tour wins 
2004 New Innsbrook Country Club Futures Golf Classic

Other wins 
2001 Kosaido Thailand Ladies Open (as an amateur)

See also 

List of Florida Gators women's golfers on the LPGA Tour

Team appearances
Amateur
Espirito Santo Trophy (representing Thailand): 2002

Professional
Lexus Cup (representing Asia team): 2005

References

External links 

Naree Song at SeoulSisters.com

Naree Song
South Korean female golfers
Florida Gators women's golfers
LPGA Tour golfers
Naree Song
South Korean twins
Twin sportspeople
Naree Song
Sportspeople from Bradenton, Florida
Naree Song
South Korean people of Thai descent
1986 births
Living people